St. Elmo Historic District 

may refer to:
 St. Elmo Historic District, St. Elmo, Colorado, a National Register of Historic Places (NRHP)-listed ghost town district that makes up part or all of St. Elmo, Colorado
 St. Elmo Historic District (Chattanooga, Tennessee), listed on the NRHP in Tennessee, and the neighborhood St. Elmo, home of an incline railway

See also
St. Elmo (disambiguation)